Hjärtat fullt is a 2008 studio album by Anna Stadling & Idde Schultz.

Track listing
Chaufför (Senor) (Bob Dylan, Christer Sunesson)
En plats i solen (Ulf Stureson)
Där dimma döljer dag (Dimming of the Day) (Richard Thompson, Ola Magnell)
Vind i seglen (Ulf Stureson)
Fyra dörrar till min syster (Staffan Hellstrand)
Jordeliv (Ulf Stureson)
Tokyo line (Anders F. Rönnblom)
Huvet fullt (Ulf Stureson)
Genom glas (Josef Zachrisson, Ulf Robertsson)
Ditt mörka hår (Ulf Sturesson)
Allt det du drömde om (Anna Stadling, Idde Schultz, Kajsa Grytt)
För dig för mig (Anders F. Rönnblom)

Contributors
Anna Stadling – vocals, guitar, producer
Idde Schultz – vocals, piano, producer
Pecka Hammarstedt – guitar, piano, organ, drums, percussion, horn, producer
Josef Zachrisson – bass, guitar, piano
Mathias Blomdahl – guitar

Charts

References 

2008 albums
Anna Stadling albums
Idde Schultz albums